Mitromorpha jaguaensis is a species of sea snail, a marine gastropod mollusk in the family Mitromorphidae.

Description

Distribution
This species occurs in the Caribbean Sea off Cuba.

References

 Espinosa J. & Ortea J. (2017). Dos nuevas especies cubanas del genero Mitromorpha Carpenter, 1865 (Mollusca: Neogastropoda: Mitromorphidae). Avicennia. 20: 33–34.

jaguaensis
Gastropods described in 2017